Dorylomorpha beckeri is a species of fly in the family Pipunculidae.

Distribution
Austria, Great Britain, Czech Republic, Estonia, Finland, Germany, Hungary, Italy, Latvia, Russia, Norway, Sweden, Switzerland, Netherlands.

References

Pipunculidae
Insects described in 1939
Diptera of Europe